"Turn On Your Radar" is the nineteenth single by Canadian rock band Prism. It was originally released in 1982, as the second single from the band's fifth studio album, Small Change. It is notably the band's follow up to the hit "Don't Let Him Know", and their second and final single to feature Henry Small as their lead vocalist, after replacing Ron Tabak.

Release
The song was a commercial disappointment peaking at a poor chart position of 64 in the US. The song gained little airplay on album-oriented rock or adult-contemporary radio formats in the US.

Personnel
Prism
 Henry Small – lead vocals
 Lindsay Mitchell – guitars
 Rocket Norton – drums
 Al Harlow – bass guitar

Sales chart performance

References

External links
 

1981 songs
1982 singles
Prism (band) songs
Capitol Records singles